Fairview may refer to:

Places

Canada
 Fairview, Alberta (disambiguation)
 Fairview, British Columbia
 Fairview, Nova Scotia
 Fairview, Kenyon Township, North Glengarry, Ontario
 Fairview, Vancouver, British Columbia

New Zealand
 Fairview, Bay of Plenty, a settlement near Katikati
 Fairview, New Zealand, a locality near Timaru
 Fairview Heights, New Zealand, a suburb of Auckland
 Fairview Downs, a suburb of Hamilton

South Africa
 Fairview, Barkly East, Eastern Cape
 Fairview, Gauteng, Johannesburg
 Fairview, Mossel Bay, Western Cape

United States
List of places called Fairview in the United States

Other countries
 Fairview, Dublin, Ireland
 Fairview, Quezon City, Philippines
 Fairview, Cheltenham, UK

Houses and homes 
 Fairview, Maleny, Queensland, Australia, a heritage-listed house
 William Jennings Bryan House (Lincoln, Nebraska), U.S., also known as Fairview
 Fairview (Delaware City, Delaware), U.S.
 Fairview (Odessa, Delaware, 1773), U.S.
 Fairview (Odessa, Delaware, 1850), U.S.
 Fairview (Amherst, Virginia), U.S.
 Fairview (Spotsylvania County, Virginia), U.S.
 Fairview (Burlington, West Virginia), U.S.
 Fair View School, a historic building in Pope County, Arkansas, U.S.

Other uses
 Fairview (play), Pulitzer prize-winning 2018 play by Jackie Sibblies Drury
 Fairview (TV series), an adult animated TV series executive produced by Stephen Colbert
 Fairview (surveillance program), an American surveillance program
 Fairview Wine and Cheese, a South African business
 Fairview, the fictional setting of the TV show, Desperate Housewives
 USS Fairview (EPCER-850), a ship of the U.S. Navy decommissioned in 1968
 Fairview Entertainment, the production company founded by Jon Favreau

See also

 Fairview Park (disambiguation)
 Fairview School (disambiguation)
 Fairview Township (disambiguation)
 Fairview Road (disambiguation)
 Fairview Drive (disambiguation)